Crivăţu may refer to several villages in Romania:

 Crivăţu, a village in Cuca, Argeș
 Crivăţu, a village in Cornești, Dâmbovița

See also 
 Crivăț River